The two hundred euro note (€200) is the second-highest value euro banknote (and the highest value banknote in production) and has been used since the introduction of the euro (in its cash form) in 2002. 
The note is used in the 25 countries that have the euro as their sole currency (with 23 legally adopting it); with a population of about 343 million. In December 2022, there were about 852,000,000 €200 banknotes in circulation around the eurozone. It is the second least widely circulated denomination, accounting for 2.9% of the total banknotes.

It is the second-largest note, measuring 153 × 82 mm, and the first series has a yellow colour scheme and the second series has a brown colour scheme. The two hundred euro banknotes depict bridges and arches/doorways in Art Nouveau style (19th and 20th centuries). The €200 note contains several complex security features such as watermarks, invisible ink, holograms and microprinting that document its authenticity.

The new banknotes of the Europa series 200 euro banknote was released on 28 May 2019.

History 

The euro was founded on 1 January 1999, when it became the currency of over 300 million people in Europe. For the first three years of its existence it was an invisible currency, only used in accountancy. Euro cash was not introduced until 1 January 2002, when it replaced the national banknotes and coins of the countries in eurozone 12, such as the Finnish markka.

Slovenia joined the Eurozone in 2007, Cyprus and Malta in 2008, Slovakia in 2009, Estonia in 2011, Latvia joined on 1 January 2014 and Lithuania joined on 1 January 2015.

The changeover period 

The changeover period during which the former currencies' notes and coins were exchanged for those of the euro lasted about two months, from 1 January 2002 until 28 February 2002. The official date on which the national currencies ceased to be legal tender varied from member state to member state. The earliest date was in Germany, where the mark officially ceased to be legal tender on 31 December 2001, though the exchange period lasted for two months after that. Even after the old currencies ceased to be legal tender, they continued to be accepted by national central banks for ten years or more.

Changes 

Notes printed before November 2003 bear the signature of the first president of the European Central Bank, Wim Duisenberg, who was replaced on 1 November 2003 by Jean-Claude Trichet, whose signature appears on issues from November 2003 to March 2012. Notes issued after March 2012 bear the signature of the third president of the European Central Bank,  Mario Draghi.

Until now there has been only one series of euro notes; however a new series, similar to the current one, is planned to be released. The European Central Bank will in due course announce when banknotes of the first series lose legal tender status.

As of June 2012, current issues do not reflect the expansion of the European Union: Cyprus is not depicted on current notes, as the map does not extend far enough east; and Malta is also missing as it does not meet the current series' minimum size for depiction. The European Central Bank plans to redesign the notes every seven or eight years, and a second series of banknotes is already in preparation. New production and anti-counterfeiting techniques will be employed on the new notes, but the design will be of the same theme and colours identical to the current series: bridges and arches. However, they will still be recognisable as a new series.

Design 

The €200 note measures  ×  and has a yellow colour scheme. All euro banknotes depict bridges and arches/doorways, each in a different historical European style: the €200 note shows the Art Nouveau era (19th and 20th centuries). Although Robert Kalina's original designs were intended to show real monuments, for political reasons the bridge and art are merely hypothetical examples of the architectural era.

Like all euro notes, it contains the denomination, the EU flag, the signature of the president of the ECB and the initials of that bank in different EU languages, a depiction of EU territories overseas, the stars from the EU flag and twelve security features as listed below.

Security features (first series) 
The €200 note is protected by:
 Colour changing ink used on the numeral located on the back of the note, that appears to change colour from purple to brown when the note is tilted.
 A see-through number printed at the top corner of the note, on both sides, appears to combine perfectly to form the value numeral when held against the light.
 A glossy stripe, at the back of the note, showing the value numeral and the euro symbol.
 A hologram: the hologram image changes between the value and a window or doorway, but in the background,  rainbow-coloured concentric circles of micro-letters appear, moving from the centre to the edges of the patch.
 A EURion constellation: this is a pattern of symbols found on a number of banknote designs worldwide since about 1996. It is added to help software detect the presence of a banknote in a digital image.
 Watermarks, which appear when held up to the light.
 Raised printing: in the main image, the lettering and the value numerals on the front of the banknotes will be raised.
 Ultraviolet ink; the paper itself does not glow, fibres embedded in the paper appear, and are coloured red, blue and green: the EU flag is green and has orange stars, the ECB President's, currently Mario Draghi's, signature turns green, the large stars and small circles on the front glow and the European map, a bridge and the value numeral on the back appear in yellow.
 Microprinting: on various areas of the banknotes there is microprinting, for example, inside the "ΕΥΡΩ" (EURO in Greek characters) on the front. The micro-text is sharp, not blurred.
 A security thread, embedded in the banknote paper. The thread will appear as a dark stripe when held up to the light. The word "EURO" and the value is embedded in tiny letters on the thread.
 Perforations in the hologram which will form the euro symbol. There are also small numbers showing the value.
 A matted surface; the note paper is made out of pure cotton, which feels crisp and firm, not limp or waxy.
 Barcodes,
 A serial number.

Security features (Europa series) 
In addition to the previous series' features the Europa series include a "Satellite Hologram" which shows two small € symbols that circle the denomination number when the banknote is tilted.

Circulation 

The European Central Bank is closely monitoring the circulation and stock of the euro coins and banknotes. It is a task of the Eurosystem to ensure an efficient and smooth supply of euro notes and to maintain their integrity throughout the euro area.

In December 2022, there were  €200 banknotes in circulation around the euro area for €.

This is a net number, i.e. the number of banknotes issued by the Eurosystem central banks, without further distinction as to who is holding the currency issued, thus also including the stocks held by credit institutions.

Besides the date of the introduction of the first set to January 2002, the publication of figures is more significant through the maximum number of banknotes raised each year. The number is higher the end of the year, except for this note in 2008, 2010, 2012 and 2015.

The figures are as follows:

On 28 May 2019, a new 'Europe' series was issued.

The first series of notes were issued in conjunction with those for a few weeks in the series 'Europe' until existing stocks are exhausted, then gradually withdrawn from circulation. Both series thus run parallel but the proportion tends inevitably to a sharp decrease in the first series.

The latest figures provided by the ECB are the following :

Legal information 
Legally, both the European Central Bank and the central banks of the eurozone countries have the right to issue the seven different euro banknotes. In practice, only the national central banks of the zone physically issue and withdraw euro banknotes. The European Central Bank does not have a cash office and is not involved in any cash operations.

Tracking 
There are several communities of people in Europe, in particular EuroBillTracker, who, as a hobby, track the euro banknotes that pass through their hands, recording where they travel. The aim is to record as many notes as possible to know details about their spread, i.e. where the notes travel, and generate statistics and rankings: for example, in which countries there are more tickets. EuroBillTracker has registered over 180 million notes as of September 2018, worth more than €3.3 billion.

References

External links 
 

Euro banknotes
Two-hundred-base-unit banknotes